Ben Dixon may refer to:

 Ben Dixon (Australian rules footballer) (born 1977), Australian rules player
 Ben Dixon (English footballer) (born 1974), English football (soccer) player
 Ben Dixon (fictional character), in the Robotech Universe
 Ben Dixon (musician) (born 1934), American jazz drummer